WFXO (1050 AM) is a radio station licensed to serve Alexander City, Alabama, United States. The station is owned by Marble City Media LLC and simulcasts on FM translator W242CP (96.3). It is branded as "KiX 96.3", with a country format.

History
In August 2004, Casey Network LLC (Jimmy Jarrell, president/CEO) reached an agreement to sell this station, then known as WRFS, to Joy Christian Communications Inc. (Ed L. Smith, president) for a reported sale price of $175,000. At the time of the sale, the station broadcast an adult contemporary music format.

In January 2007, Joy Christian Communications Inc. (Ed Smith, president) reached an agreement to sell this station to Racquel Humphrey for a reported sale price of $230,000. At the time of the sale, the station broadcast a Southern Gospel music format.

The station was assigned the WBNM call letters by the Federal Communications Commission on May 15, 2008.

In 2008, WBNM became an official ESPN Radio affiliate while keeping Southern Gospel music programming on Sunday mornings.

In 2010, WBNM decided to switch from ESPN Radio to The True Oldies Channel from Citadel Media.

In the spring of 2012, WBNM switched to Citadel's (now part of Cumulus Media) Real Country format, and then in the fall of 2012, the former "Solid Gospel" format of WJHO began broadcasting on WBNM and its new FM translator at 99.1.

On December 23, 2015, immediately following a sale to Westburg Broadcasting Montgomery LLC, the station was operated by Marble City Media LLC and simulcast its WRFS-FM, Rockford. On February 18, 2016, ownership transferred to Marble City Media LLC (at a purchase price of $10,000), and the call sign was changed to WLMA. New translator W242CP on 96.3 MHz was added in March 2016, with a format change to classic country on March 26.

Marble City Media LLC owns and operates stations primarily serving Sylacauga-Childersburg, Alexander City-Dadeville-Lake Martin-Wetumpka-Montgomery, and Auburn-Opelika.

On May 25, 2018, WLMA rebranded as "KiX 96.3"

On February 13, 2019, the station changed its call sign to WSGN.

On July 27, 2022, the station announced that it would change its call sign to WFXO on July 31.

References

External links

FXO (AM)
Radio stations established in 1947
1947 establishments in Alabama
Classic country radio stations in the United States